Campylites is a genus within the oppeliida subfamily Ochetoceratinae, equivalent to Neoprionoceras Spath 1928, that lived during the Oxfordian state at the beginning of the Late Jurassic.

Campylites differs from Ochetoceras in its narrower and more definitely tricarinate venter and in having more distinct primary ribs. It also lacks the mid lateral groove characteristic of Ochetoceras.

References
Notes

Bibliography
W.J. Arkell, et al., 1957. Mesozoic Ammonoidea, Treatise on Invertebrate Paleongology, Part L. Geological Society of America and University of Kansas Press.

Ammonitida
Late Jurassic ammonites
Prehistoric cephalopod genera
Prehistoric animals of Madagascar
Fossil taxa described in 1922